The 1993 Pacific Tigers football team represented the University of the Pacific in the 1993 NCAA Division I-A football season. The Tigers offense scored 184 points while the defense allowed 260 points.

Schedule

References

Pacific
Pacific Tigers football seasons
Pacific Tigers football